Demag Cranes AG is a German heavy equipment manufacturer part of the Konecranes group. 

The roots of Demag date back prior to its formation, but became Märkische Maschinenbau-Anstalt, Ludwig A.-G in 1906 as the biggest crane building company in Germany employing 250-300 people. The company was a manufacturer of industrial cranes that included types like, bridge cranes, hoist (device), overhead cranes, Gantry crane to name a few. In 1910 came the hour of the Deutsche Maschinenfabrik in Duisburg – known worldwide by its telegram abbreviation Demag (now Demag Cranes & Components GmbH). In 1973 The Mannesmann group assumed ownership of Demag. Since that time the company has continued to grow and change. Parts of the company under core business structuring moved from its ownership to focus the main concept of the company.

Founding
The Demag company was formed finally 1910 in Duisburg through the union of the Märkische Maschinenbau-Anstalt L. Stuckenholz AG, the Duisburg Mechanical Engineering AG, and the Benrath Machine Works GmbH.

The Märkische Maschinenbau-Anstalt L. Stuckenholz AG traces back to the machine factory Mechanische Werkstätten Harkort & Co., founded 1819 in Wetter an der Ruhr, already beginning the manufacturing of cranes in 1840.

In 1908, they designed what was then the world's largest floating crane, built for Harland & Wolff in Belfast, which would be used for the building of the passenger liners RMS Olympic and RMS Titanic.

Starting in 1925, Demag also manufactured excavators. They expanded to manufacture locomotives and railroad cars. During the Second World War, armoured fighting vehicles (in particular Bergepanther) were built in the Berlin Staaken plant.

During the buildup to, and during World War II, Demag-designed halftrack military vehicles, both in unarmored "artillery tractor" models in the late 1930s, the basis for the powertrain of their armored Sd.Kfz. 250, which itself played an important role during the war, with just over 6,600 built by Demag and their subcontractors.

Hydraulic era
In 1954, Demag developed their first hydraulic excavators. Demag would soon expand into construction machines, vehicle cranes, moving and conveying engineering (workshop crane and control devices), steel mill technology (complete metallurgical plants, in particular continuous casting equipment), compressors, and compressed air engineering. The company also became a world leader in the manufacturing of injection moulding machines.

As part of the Mannesmann group

In 1973 the ownership of Demag was assumed by the Mannesmann group, based in Düsseldorf. In 1983 Mannesmann-Demag AG and Wean United, Inc. of Pittsburgh, United States, founded a daughter company to produce steel working equipment, Mannesmann Demag Wean Co.

A joint venture with the Japanese manufacturer Komatsu led to spinning off of the large-scale excavation operations and their renaming as Komatsu Mining.

The steel and rolling mill technology division, based in Duisburg, was spun off to Schloemann-Siemag (SMS) and continues today under the name SMS group.

The compressor division was sold in 1996 to CompAir, which was then  part of the British Siebe/Invensys group, but has since become an independent company.

Later (1999), the injection moulding manufacturing was merged with that of Krauss-Maffei, which had itself been acquired by Mannesmann from 1989, to form Mannesmann Demag Krauss Maffei and formed part of Mannesmann Atecs (for Advanced Technologies), a holding company for all of Mannesmann's non-telecom activities. Krauss Maffei's general equipment manufacturing and defence portions later passed to Linke/Hoffmann/Busch. The holding company was later named Mannesmann Plastics Machinery or MPM, with primary divisions Demag Plastics and Krauss-Maffei.

Following the acquisition of Mannesmann by Vodafone in 1999-2000, the Atecs holding company was divested to a consortium of Siemens and Bosch, which then integrated parts of it into one or the other company and spun off others. The Demag units became part of Siemens.

In the autumn of 2001, Siemens divested by far the majority of these to Kohlberg Kravis Roberts (KKR). At this same time the world economy was going through another recession, entailing downsizing and the reduction of jobs. Those that remained were restructured and became part of the new company focus for future growth.

Demag Cranes and Components was one of the non-core divisions carved out from Siemens and acquired by KKR. KKR initiated a major reorganization of the Demag Crane and Components organization, including a refocused effort of their product lines. The production and general company focus changed to Overhead cranes, hoists, Gantry cranes, and Portal cranes under the name Gottwald. Parts of the conveying engineering activities remained with Siemens under the name Dematic. The remainder of the conveying engineering firm was sold in 2006 as Demag Cranes AG, together with the quay crane manufacturer. Demag Cranes was listed publicly in 2006, and has since increased its market share both in the US and worldwide. MPM was also sold to KKR and is now part of Sumitomo Heavy Industries

In August 2002, the Demag crane plant in Zweibrücken became part of the US Terex company. The brand name Terex-Demag continues.
In 2011 the BBC Television programme How to Build A Super Jumbo Wing showed Demag equipment at Broughton, Flintshire, Wales, UK, lifting the largest wing ever produced for a civil airliner, 17.7 metres from front to back and 36.3 metres from fuselage to wingtip. This is fitted to the Airbus A380, the world's biggest passenger aircraft.

Notable dates.

1819 The present-day Demag Cranes & Components GmbH founded under the name Mechanische Werkstätten Harkort & Co. in Wetter an der Ruhr. First Steam powered crane produced by Ludwig Stuckenholz company. Now Demag Cranes & Components GmbH.
1840: Demag Cranes & Components starts full production of Overhead cranes in Germany.
1906 The present-day Gottwald Port Technology GmbH founded under the name of Maschinenfabrik Ernst Halbach AG in Düsseldorf
1910 Successor companies to Mechanische Werkstätten Harkort & Co. become part of Deutsche Maschinenfabrik AG (Demag: Demag starts production of Electric motor hoist.
1956 Leo Gottwald KG builds the first mobile harbor crane
1969: Demag introduces the first AC motor with a sliding rotor on its crane product in the USA.
1988 Mannesmann takes over Leo Gottwald KG and integrates it in Mannesmann Demag AG
1992 Restructuring of the Mannesmann Demag Group and spin-off of Mannesmann Demag Fördertechnik AG in Wetter
1996 Mannesmann Demag Fördertechnik AG takes over the Mobile Cranes segment from Mannesmann Demag AG in Duisburg.
1997 Mannesmann Demag Fördertechnik AG is renamed Mannesmann Dematic AG
2000 Mannesmann Dematic becomes an integral part of the Atecs Mannesmann AG Group; spin-off of Demag Cranes & Components GmbH (Wetter); Mannesmann taken over by Vodafone; Siemens AG and Robert Bosch GmbH acquire Atecs Mannesmann; the mechanical engineering division of Atecs Mannesmann AG, to which the current segments of Demag Cranes belonged, remains in the Siemens Group
2002 Demag Cranes & Components GmbH and Gottwald Port Technology GmbH taken over by Demag Holding S.à r.l (Luxembourg), in which private equity investment funds advised by KKR hold an 81% interest and Siemens AG holds 19% interest
2005: Demag Crane & Components Corp. produces the first "Smart hoist" with self-diagnostic capability.
2006 Consolidation of Demag Cranes & Components GmbH and Gottwald Port Technology GmbH under the umbrella of Demag Cranes AG and IPO and 23 June 2006.
Withdrawal of Demag Holding S.à.r.l..

2010: Demag becomes the first company to receive the industry certification by HMI.
30 June 2011: Terex gains 67% of Demag Cranes.
2017: Finland based Konecranes acquires Demag Overhead division in Wetter and Gottwald Port Cranes division from Terex and changes the name to Demag Cranes & Components GmbH
2019: Japan based Tadano acquires the Demag Mobile Cranes business from Terex changes the name to Tadano Demag GmbH.
2020: Konecranes acquires MHE-Demag after purchasing Jebsen & Jessen’s stake.

Gallery

References

External links

Demag Web Site

Manufacturing companies based in Düsseldorf
Engineering companies of Germany
German brands
Manufacturing companies established in 1906
Crane manufacturers
1906 establishments in Germany